"Sign o' the Times" (stylized as "Sign "☮︎" the Times") is the lead single from American musician Prince's 1987 album of the same name. Despite being negative in nature, the song was originally intended for two separate Prince albums meant to be released in 1986, that were both shelved: Dream Factory and Crystal Ball. (Many of the tracks from both of these albums ended up on the album Sign o' the Times.) Prince performed all vocals & instruments on the song. "Sign o' the Times" was reportedly written and composed on a Sunday, when Prince usually wrote his most introspective songs.

The song proved popular upon release, topping the R&B chart, and reaching number three on the Billboard Hot 100 and number 10 on the UK Singles Chart. In 2010 Rolling Stone ranked "Sign o' the Times" at number 304 on their list of the 500 Greatest Songs of All Time. By July 1987, it sold 200,000 copies in the United States.  In 1987, Village Voices Pazz & Jop critics' poll named "Sign o' the Times" the best single of the year, Prince's third recognition in that category. The song is also included in The Rock and Roll Hall of Fame's 500 Songs that Shaped Rock and Roll. Cat Glover is pictured on the single hiding her face behind a black heart.

Composition and arrangement
The song was constructed by Prince almost entirely on the Fairlight sampling synthesizer, which provides the primary keyboard riff and sampled electronic bass sounds heard on the track. Unlike some artists, Prince did not program new sounds for this song. He simply used the stock sounds the Fairlight offered, including the famed "orchestra hit"  towards the end of the composition. The single marked a shift from those pulled from the albums Parade and Around the World in a Day, with a spare, electronic-based arrangement, simple drum machine hits and minimal stacked synth patterns, as well as a bluesy, funk-rock guitar part (cut from the single edit of the song). The record was noticeably bluesier and more downcast (both melodically and lyrically) than any of Prince's previous singles, addressing various socio-political problems including AIDS, gang violence, natural disasters, poverty, drug abuse, the Space Shuttle Challenger disaster and impending nuclear holocaust. This record showcased Prince's ability to merge classic and modern rhythm and blues characteristics into one song.

Artwork
The single's cover features new band member Cat Glover posing with a large heart covering her face, and on the back of the cover, posing with Prince's guitar; there was a popular rumor that incorrectly insisted that the front cover showed Prince in drag.  All photo images for “Sign O‘ The Times“, including tour book, were photographed by Jeff Katz.

Music video
The accompanying music video for "Sign o' the Times" was produced by Jae Flora, of Flora Films, and supervised at Warner Bros Records by Susan Silverman. This duo picked the director, Bill Konersman, based on his graphic design background. The text animation is considered one of the earliest instances of a lyric video.

Track listings
 7" single
A. "Sign o' the Times" (edit) – 3:42
B. "La, La, La, He, He, Hee" – 3:21

 12" single
A. "Sign o' the Times" (LP version) – 4:57
B. "La, La, La, He, He, Hee" (Highly Explosive) – 10:32

Personnel
 Prince – lead vocals and various instruments

B-side
La, La, La, He, He, Hee depicts a chase between a cat and a dog and contains a snare drum which sounds like a dog's bark, which is a sample from the Fairlight CMI sample-synthesizer. The song is fast-paced and reminiscent of P-Funk. It features Sheila E. on vocals and percussion and Eric Leeds and Atlanta Bliss on saxophone and trumpet respectively. The song's edit is featured on The Hits/The B-Sides. Per the liner notes of The Hits/The B-Sides, Sheena Easton dared Prince to write a song with the lyrics "la, la, la, he, he, hee', which resulted in a shared writing credit.

Charts

Weekly charts

Year-end charts

References

Prince (musician) songs
Songs written by Prince (musician)
1987 singles
Nina Simone songs
Paisley Park Records singles
Warner Records singles
Song recordings produced by Prince (musician)
Political songs
Songs about HIV/AIDS